Patrick Nicolas Jean Sixte Ghislain Bauchau (born 6 December 1938) is a Belgian actor best known for his roles in the films A View to a Kill, The Rapture and Panic Room, as well as the TV shows The Pretender and House.

Biography

Early life
Patrick Bauchau was born in Brussels, Belgium on 6 December 1938, the son of Mary (née Kozyrev), a Russian-born school administrator and publisher, and Henry Bauchau, a school administrator, lawyer, publisher, writer, and psychoanalyst who served as an officer in the Belgian Underground during World War II. He was raised in Belgium, Switzerland and England.

He attended Oxford University on an academic scholarship and speaks German, French, English, Spanish, Italian, and a little Russian and Dutch.

He is married to the sister of model and actress Brigitte Bardot, Mijanou Bardot, and lives in Los Angeles.

Career
Bauchau began his career in French New Wave cinema, including acting in two films by Éric Rohmer, La Carrière de Suzanne (1963) and La Collectionneuse (1967). He also participated in the New German Cinema in films like Wim Wenders' Der Stand der Dinge (1982).

Bauchau is better known for his roles in American television. Bauchau has starred in many different TV shows and movies, including Choose Me, A View to a Kill as Scarpine, The Pretender, Kindred: The Embraced, The Rapture, Clear and Present Danger, The Cell, Panic Room, Boy Culture, Carnivàle, 2012, Extraordinary Measures and Get the Gringo. In 1987, he was considered for the part of Captain Jean-Luc Picard in Star Trek: The Next Generation. In 1989 he starred as the murderer in Columbo: Murder: A Self Portrait. In 1992 he guest-starred on Murder, She Wrote: The Monte Carlo Murders. In 2004 he appeared in the Ray Charles biopic Ray as Dr. Hacker. In 2005, he appeared as a guest star on ABC's Alias, as well as on the Fox shows House and 24.

In 2007 Bauchau took the lead dramatic role in the biographical movie The Gray Man—a thriller which dramatised the crimes of the American sadomasochistic serial killer, rapist, and cannibal Albert Fish. In 2009, he appeared as a guest star on ABC's show Castle. For movies, he often performs the French dubbing of his characters himself, as he is a native French speaker. In 2011, Bauchau guest-starred on the episode "Eye for an Eye" of USA's Burn Notice.

Filmography

References

External links

1938 births
Belgian male film actors
Living people
Belgian people of Russian descent
20th-century Belgian male actors
21st-century Belgian male actors
Expatriate male actors in the United States
Alumni of the University of Oxford
Male actors from Brussels